Jiawang District is a suburban district of Xuzhou, Jiangsu province, China. It is located in the northern part of Xuzhou and adjacent to the prefecture-level city of Zaozhuang, Shandong in the north. Its economy was overwhelmingly dependent on coal, but , the last local mine closed.

History 
Some people of the environs settled in Jiawang nowadays, since the late Ming. The Jia clan among them set up home around a pool, thus the pool was called Jiajiawang, means"Jia Clan's Pool". Similar as Xuhui District for Xujiahui in Shanghai, Jiajiawang was simplified as Jiawang then.

In the summer of 1880, a local peasant Zhou Mian discovered coals there, along with his fellows. They mined from an open-cast coal then sold. Later, according to Zuo Zongtang's request, local official Hu Jingzhi invited Hu Enxie, another official from Nanjing, to undertake the mining project in 1881, and a British mining engineer was hired for prospecting in the next year.

The Cantonese businessman, Wu Weixiong, took over the properties and co-founded Jiawang Coal Company in the 1890s, Since the financial condition worsened, the company was closed afterwards. Wu trusted the facilities to Hu Enixie's son, Guangguo. Guanguo raised capital by floating shares, but the limited company he founded failed soon. So he turned to Yuan Shikai's cousin, Yuan Shichuan, who then became the principal shareholder of the company. The business got back to basics with Yuan's support. In 1930, the company was acquired by Liu Hongsheng and renamed East China Coal Limited Company.

In 1938, the Japanese captured Jiawang. Then they converted the company under military control. After the end of the Second Sino-Japanese War, the Republic of China's government took over the company.

In 1928, Jiawang town was formed. In 1964, it was elevated to a mining district status, and it was turned into a district in the next year.

Administrative divisions
In the present, Jiawang District has 2 subdistricts and 7 towns.
2 subdistricts
 Laokuang
 Xiaqiao

7 towns
 Jiawang
 Qingshanquan
 Dawu
 Zizhuang
 Tashan
 Biantang
 Jiangzhuang

References

External links
Official website of Jiawang Government 

County-level divisions of Jiangsu
Administrative divisions of Xuzhou